Charles Sharp (6 February 1848 – 23 September 1903) was an English cricketer. Sharp was a left-handed batsman who bowled slow left-arm orthodox. He was born at Horsham, Sussex.

Davey made his first-class debut for Sussex against Surrey at The Oval in 1873. He made sixteen further first-class appearances for the county, the last of which came against Yorkshire at the Fartown Ground, Huddersfield, in 1884. In his seventeen first-class matches for the county, he scored 345 runs at an average of 11.12, with a high score of 54. This score was his only half century and came against Gloucestershire in 1873. With the ball, he took 14 wickets at a bowling average of 15.28, with best figures of 6/34. These figures were his only five wicket haul and came against Kent in 1879.

Sharp was club captain of Sussex in the 1879 season. He died on 23 September 1903.

References

External links
Charles Sharp at ESPNcricinfo
Charles Sharp at CricketArchive

1848 births
1903 deaths
People from Horsham
English cricketers
Sussex cricketers
Sussex cricket captains